This is a list of movie theaters notable enough for Wikipedia articles. See also the list of movie theatre chains from across the world.

Bangladesh

Canada

Finland

France

Germany

Italy

Netherlands

Poland

Sweden

Turkey

United Kingdom

United States

Misc

See also 
 Movie theater